SWA is a biweekly business magazine based in Jakarta, Indonesia. Established in 1985, the magazine was first named as SWA Sembada. It has attracted thousands of readers across the archipelago. The magazine is part of Sembada Swakarya foundation and is published by PT Grafiti Pers, a subsidiary of the foundation.

References

External links
 

1985 establishments in Indonesia
Biweekly magazines
Business magazines
Indonesian-language magazines
Magazines established in 1985
Magazines published in Jakarta